Bear Creek is a stream in northwestern  St. Francois County in the U.S. state of Missouri. It is a tributary of the Big River.

According to tradition, bear wallows in the area account for the name.

See also
List of rivers of Missouri

References

Rivers of St. Francois County, Missouri
Rivers of Missouri